Benoît Coulanges (born 20 December 1994) is a French downhill mountain biker. In 2021, he finished second in the UCI Downhill World Championships in Val di Sole, Italy.

He is a member of the UCI Elite team DORVAL AM COMMENCAL.

Major results
2018
 2nd  European Downhill Championships
2019
 2nd  European Downhill Championships
2020
 1st  National Downhill Championships
 2nd  European Downhill Championships
2021
 1st  National Downhill Championships
 2nd  Downhill, UCI Mountain Bike World Championships

External links

References

Living people
Downhill mountain bikers
1994 births
French male cyclists
French mountain bikers